Under the Ancien Régime, a pays d'états was a type of généralité, or fiscal and financial region where, in contrast to the pays d'election, an estates provincial or representative assembly of the three orders had retained its traditional role of negotiating the raising of taxes with the royal commissaires or intendants, dividing the tax burden by diocese and parish, and controlling tax collection. The estates also held onto part of the funds thus raised to repair and develop the roads in its province.

According to Roland Mousnier and Bernard Barbiche the pays d'états were:

 Alsace. Estates suppressed - 17th century 
 Anjou. Estates suppressed - 15th century 
 Artois. Estates suppressed - 1789. 
 Auvergne. Estates suppressed - 17th century 
 Basse-Navarre. Estates suppressed - 1789. 
 Béarn. Estates suppressed - 1789. 
 Berry. Estates suppressed - 16th century 
 Bigorre. Estates suppressed - 1789.
 Bourgogne (Burgundy). Estates suppressed - 1789. 
 Bresse. Estates suppressed - 1789.
 Bretagne (Brittany). Estates suppressed - 1789. 
 Bugey. Estates suppressed - 1789.
 Cambrésis. Estates suppressed - 1789.
 Charolais. Estates suppressed - 1789.
 Comminges Estates supressed - 1622
 Corse (Corsica). Estates suppressed - 1789. 
 Dauphiné. Estates suppressed - 17th century 
 Flandre (Flanders). Estates suppressed - 1789. 
 Foix. Estates suppressed - 1789. 
 Franche-Comté. Estates suppressed - 18th century 
 Gévaudan. Estates suppressed - 1789.
 Hainaut (Hainault). Estates suppressed - 1789. 
 Labourd. Estates suppressed - 1789.
 Languedoc. Estates suppressed - 1789. 
 Limousin. Estates suppressed - 15th century 
 Mâconnais. Estates suppressed - 1789.
 Maine. Estates suppressed - 16th century 
 Marche. Estates suppressed - 15th century 
 Marsan. Estates suppressed - 1789.
 Nébouzan. Estates suppressed - 1789.
 Normandie (Normandy). Estates suppressed - 17th century 
 Orléanais. Estates suppressed - 16th century 
 Périgord. Estates suppressed - 16th century 
 Provence. Estates suppressed - 1789. 
 Quatre-Vallées. Estates suppressed - 1789.
 Quercy. Estates suppressed - 17th century 
 Rouergue. Estates suppressed - 17th century 
 Soule. Estates suppressed - 1789.
 Touraine. Estates suppressed - 16th century 
 Velay. Estates suppressed - 1789.
 Vivarais. Estates suppressed - 1789.

Notes and references

See also 
Subdivisions of France under the Ancien Régime

Pays d'etats

Economic history of the Ancien Régime